Heartwork is the fourth studio album by English extreme metal band Carcass. The album was released in the UK by Earache Records on 18 October 1993, and in the United States on 11 January 1994 by Columbia Records, making it the band's only major label release. Heartwork has been described as the band's "breakthrough" and "mid-period masterpiece", as well as a landmark album in melodic death metal. The album was recorded at Parr Street Studios, Liverpool from 18 May – 21 June 1993.

The sculpture depicted in the cover art, "Life Support 1993," was designed by H. R. Giger, and is an update of a sculpture he created in the late 1960s. The video for the title track features a real-life interpretation of the sculpture, including a human welded as a part of it. The album was reissued as a Dualdisc on 2 June 2008.

Until 2021's Torn Arteries, this was the only Carcass album to have the same lineup as the previous album. Guitarist Michael Amott left the band after the recording of the album before founding Spiritual Beggars, and was temporarily replaced by Mike Hickey. In The Pathologist's Report, Bill Steer says Heartwork is his favourite Carcass album.

Release
Heartwork sold at least 81,000 units. It spawned one single under the same name that featured the title track and non-album tracks "This is Your Life" and "Rot 'n' Roll".

2008 reissue
The album was re-released in 2008 as part of an ongoing series of Carcass reissues to tie in with their reunion. The main album is presented as one side of a Dualdisc, while the DVD side features the fourth part of an extended interview/documentary titled The Pathologist's Report Part IV: Epidemic. Also included in the reissue is a bonus disc including the entire album in demo form, something recorded by the band before recording the actual album in an effort to be better prepared. The demo features the same 10 songs in a slightly different order. Later editions have the DVD on a separate disc, bringing the total to 3 discs. The album is presented in a 12-panel digipak with full lyrics and artwork.

Critical reception

Heartwork is widely considered to be one of the greatest death metal albums of all time. In an October 2007 interview, Evile frontman Matt Drake described Heartwork as "just one of the best albums ever." Hank Schteamer of Pitchfork described Heartwork as Carcass's "mid-period masterpiece," and praised the album as being "perhaps the greatest example to date of an extreme-metal band nodding to the polish and swagger of above-ground rock while retaining their core ferocity." Johnny Loftus called the album the band's "breakthrough release" on AllMusic, and suggested that while "some purists might decry its melodic breaks for soloing or nods toward conventional structure[,] Heartwork is that rare album that so carefully dissects and reconstructs its original form that its additional body parts seem like they were there all along."

In May 2013, Heartwork was inducted into the Decibel Magazine Hall of Fame, becoming the 100th overall inductee and second Carcass album to be featured in the Decibel Hall of Fame, right after Necroticism.

In 2017, Rolling Stone ranked Heartwork as 51st on their list of 'The 100 Greatest Metal Albums of All Time.'

Legacy
The band Carnal Forge named themselves after the song of the same name from this album.

Track listing

Personnel

Carcass
 Jeff Walker – vocals, bass
 Michael Amott – guitar
 Bill Steer – guitar 
 Ken Owen – drums

Additional personnel
 Keith Andrews – engineering
 Dave Buchanan – assistant engineering
 Colin Richardson – production
 Andrea Wright – assistant engineering
 H. R. Giger – front album sculpture
 Jurg Kümmer – photo
 Andrew Tuohy – design

References

Carcass (band) albums
1993 albums
Columbia Records albums
Earache Records albums
Albums with cover art by H. R. Giger